Sokon II  (Kata ya Sokon II, in Swahili) is one of the 27 administrative wards of the Arusha District Council located in the Arusha Region of Tanzania. The name Sokon comes from the Swahili word for market, sokoni. The ward shares a similar name with another ward located in Arusha Urban District called Sokon I and the formeris  one of 27 rural administrative wards in the district as of 2012. Sokon II ward is bordered by Oltoroto and Moivo ward in the west, Ilkiding'a ward to the north, Bangata ward to the east. On the southern border Sokon II is bordered by Baraa, Kimandolu and Sekei wards.  According to the 2012 census, the ward has a total population of 32,073. Thus, Sokon II is the most populous ward in Arusha District. Also the ward headquaters are Oldadai village. In addition, the Arusha District Administartion building is located in Sokon II ward.

Geography
The ward is home to major foothills of Mount Meru, namely, Kivutu at 1,944 meters tall and Kivesi Hill at 1,897 meters tall, and the samller Nariva Hill at the south side of the ward.

Economy
Like many economies of Arusha Rural District, Sokon II ward's economy is dominated by subsistence agriculture. However, Sokon II is the Seat of the Arusha Rural District thus the services catering to the administration of the ward are located there. Available attractions like Napuru Falls and the Kivesi and Kivutu hills.

Administration
The postal code for Sokon II Ward is 23208. 
The ward is divided into the following neighborhoods: 
 Ng'iresi, Sokon II
 Oldadai, Sokon II
 Sekei, Sokon II
 Sokon II, Sokon II

Education and health

Education
Sokon II ward is home to these educational institutions: 
 Oldadai Primary School
 Sekei Primary School
 Sokon II Secondary School
 Oldadai Secondary School
 Walikabaa English Medium School (private)
 Ngiresi Secondary School (private)
 Sakura Girls Secondary School (private)
 Green Acres School (private)

Healthcare
Sokon II ward is home to the following health institutions:
 Sekei LCC Health Center
 Oldadai Health Center
 Sokon II Dispensary
 Nigresi Health Center

References

Wards of Arusha District
Wards of Arusha Region